This is a list of events that occurred in the year 1977 in Portugal.

Incumbents
President: António Ramalho Eanes 
Prime Minister: Mário Soares

Arts and entertainment
Portugal participated in the Eurovision Song Contest 1977, with Os Amigos and the song "Portugal no coração".

Sport
In association football, for the first-tier league seasons, see 1976–77 Primeira Divisão and 1977–78 Primeira Divisão; for the Taça de Portugal seasons, see 1976–77 Taça de Portugal and 1977–78 Taça de Portugal. 
 18 May - Taça de Portugal Final

Births
4 February – Bruno Castanheira, Portuguese cyclist (d. 2014)
10 July – Nuno Norte, singer and winner of Ídolos (season 1)

References

 
Years of the 20th century in Portugal
Portugal